Charcot may refer to:

People
 Jean-Martin Charcot (1825–1893), French neurologist
 Jean-Baptiste Charcot (1867–1936), French explorer and physician, son of Jean-Martin Charcot

Places in Antarctica
 Charcot Bay
 Charcot Cove
 Charcot Island
 Charcot Plate, a tectonic plate under West Antarctica
 Cape Charcot
 Charcot Station, a French research station in Adélie Land

See also

Charlot (name)